Richard Ritchie (born May 2, 1955 in Mineral Wells, Texas) is a former American football quarterback who played college football for Texas A&I from 1973 to 1976.
 During his career, Ritchie had an undefeated record of 39–0. After winning in his only start during his freshman year of 1973, Texas A&I won three consecutive National Association of Intercollegiate Athletics Division I national championships. Between passing and running, he scored 59 touchdowns in his career; he also served as a placekicker for Texas A&I. Following his playing career, Ritchie was an assistant coach from 1977 to 1984 for three teams: Texas, North Texas, and Texas Tech. In 1998, Ritchie was inducted into the College Football Hall of Fame.

References

1955 births
Living people
American football quarterbacks
North Texas Mean Green football coaches
Texas A&M–Kingsville Javelinas football players
Texas Longhorns football coaches
Texas Tech Red Raiders football coaches
College Football Hall of Fame inductees
Players of American football from Texas